1999 is the fifth studio album by American recording artist Prince, released on October 27, 1982, by Warner Bros. Records. It became his first album to be recorded with his band the Revolution. 1999 critical and commercial success propelled Prince to a place in the public psyche and marked the beginning of two years of heightened fame via his following releases.

1999 was Prince's first top 10 album on the  Billboard 200, peaking at number nine, and was fifth in the  Billboard Year-End Albums of 1983. "1999", a protest against nuclear proliferation, was a Billboard Hot 100 top 20 hit, peaking at number 12. It has since become one of Prince's most recognizable compositions. "Delirious" reached number eight on the Billboard Hot 100, while "Little Red Corvette" peaked at number six, becoming Prince's highest charting US single at the time. "International Lover" was also nominated for Best Male R&B Vocal Performance at the 26th Grammy Awards, which was Prince's first Grammy Award nomination.

1999 received widespread acclaim from critics, and was seen as Prince's breakthrough album. On March 24, 1999, 1999 was certified quadruple platinum by the Recording Industry Association of America (RIAA). Following Prince's death in 2016, the album re-entered the Billboard 200 and peaked at number seven, besting its original performance on the chart thirty-three years earlier. A re-release and remaster of the album, including 35 previously unreleased recordings, was released in November 2019.

1999 has been ranked as one of the greatest albums of all time by several publications and organizations. The music videos for both "1999" and "Little Red Corvette" received heavy rotation on MTV, making Prince one of the first black artists to be prominently featured on the television channel. According to the Rolling Stone Album Guide (2004), "1999 may be Prince's most influential album: Its synth-and-drum machine-heavy arrangements codified the Minneapolis sound that loomed over mid-'80s R&B and pop, not to mention the next two decades' worth of electro, house, and techno."  It is also included on Rolling Stone's 500 Greatest Albums of All Time.  In 2008, the album was inducted into the Grammy Hall of Fame.

Composition

The album's opening title track, "1999", was also its first single and initially peaked at  44 on the US Billboard Hot 100. It was subsequently re-released following the huge success of its follow-up single and 1999s second track, "Little Red Corvette", which peaked at  6 on the US Billboard Hot 100 (like other Prince songs, it again charted after his death, reaching  3). Lisa Coleman - who sang on the album - recalled how Prince came up with "Little Red Corvette" after sleeping in her pink Mercury Montclair Maurauder. Shortly after being reissued, "1999" hit  12, and subsequently became one of Prince's most recognizable compositions.  Its composition, and inclusion in the album, may have been originally prompted by a suggestion from the record company. 

The music videos for both "1999" and "Little Red Corvette" were significant as two of the first videos by a black artist to receive heavy rotation on the newly launched music video channel, MTV, after heated controversy over its failure to promote black performers. The two tracks were later combined as a double A-side single in the United Kingdom, where it peaked at number 2. A subsequent single from the album and its third chronological track, the rockabilly-influenced "Delirious", still managed top ten status in the United States at  8, but a fourth, the double-sided single "Let's Pretend We're Married"/"Irresistible Bitch", got no further than  52.

While "Little Red Corvette" helped Prince cross over to the wider rock audience, the rest of 1999 retains the funk elements featured in previous albums and is dominated by the use of synthesizers and drum machines. The album is, however, notable within Prince's catalogue for its wide variety of themes in addition to the sexual imagery which had already become something of a trademark on his previous work. "Automatic", extending to almost ten minutes, starts side three of the album with a prominent synthesizer melody and bondage-inspired lyrical imagery which, transplanted to the music video for the track (with a scene that depicted Prince being tied up and whipped by band-members Lisa Coleman and Jill Jones), had been deemed too sexual for MTV in 1983.

"Something in the Water (Does Not Compute)", an ode to a harsh lover, is the centerpiece of a preoccupation with Computer Age themes that would continue into future albums. This is also reflected in various aspects of the album's instrumentation, with Prince fully embracing the gadgetry and sounds of emergent electro-funk and 1980s sequencing technology on tracks like "Let's Pretend We're Married" and "All the Critics Love U in New York", songs that widen his use of synthesizers and prominently feature the use of a Linn LM-1 drum machine.  1999 also contains two ballads in "Free", a piano piece encouraging people to count their blessings and be thankful for what they have, and "International Lover", a slow-paced love song for which Prince received his first Grammy Award nomination in 1984 under the category of Best Male R&B Vocal Performance.

Artwork
The album's cover features elements from the front cover of Prince's previous album, Controversy; namely the eyes and the "Rude Boy" pin in the "1999", the jacket studs in the "R" and the smile in the "P". The "I" in "Prince" contains the words "and the Revolution" written backwards (as "dna eht noituloveR"), both acknowledging his backing band and foreshadowing the next four years of his career.

Release
1999 was released on October 27, 1982, by Warner Bros. Records. It was the fifth album released by Prince. 1999 was Prince's first top ten album on the Billboard 200, peaking at number nine. It was fifth in the Billboard Year-End Albums of 1983. Following Prince's death in 2016, the album re-entered the Billboard 200 and peaked at number seven, besting its original performance on the chart thirty-three years earlier. It also peaked in the top 10 in New Zealand, reaching number six on the New Zealand Albums Chart in 1982.

Remastered, Deluxe and Super Deluxe re-issues
The album was released as a Remastered, Deluxe and Super Deluxe edition on November 29, 2019. The most elaborate re-issue contains five CDs featuring previously-unreleased tracks, and a live DVD, with a total running time of 5 hours & 53 minutes. It reached the top 20 of the charts in Belgium, the Netherlands and Hungary.

Critical reception and legacy

1999 was well received by contemporary critics. Reviewing for Rolling Stone in December 1982, Michael Hill praised Prince for "working like a colorblind technician who's studied both Devo and Afrika Bambaataa and the Soulsonic Force, keeping the [1999s] songs constantly kinetic with an inventive series of shocks and surprises." The Village Voice reviewer Robert Christgau was more reserved in his praise. While conceding that, "like every black pop auteur, Prince commands his own personal groove ... stretching his flat funk forcebeat onto two discs worth of deeply useful dance tracks", he also believed that the musician's only reliable subject remains race, leaving the critic with doubts about the messages behind the sex and apocalyptic songs.

Retrospective appraisals have been even more favorable. According to The New Rolling Stone Album Guide (2004), "1999 may be Prince's most influential album: Its synth-and-drum machine-heavy arrangements codified the Minneapolis sound that loomed over mid-'80s R&B and pop, not to mention the next two decades' worth of electro, house, and techno." Paul A. Thompson of Pitchfork noted the way Prince "marshal[led] the Reagan years and the LM-1 for his own purposes" has rarely been replicated and called 1999 a "rare record that has come to define its era while also existing outside of it, a masterpiece that immediately precedes the albums Prince fashioned, conspicuously, as masterpieces." Thompson also described the album as a "computer breathing." Also writing for Pitchfork, Maura Johnston wrote in 2016 that through the "balancing synth-funk explorations...taut pop construction, genre-bending, and the proto-nuclear fallout of lust, 1999 still sounds like a landmark release in 2016". Johnston further praised Prince's "singular vision and willingness to indulge his curiosities" for creating an "apocalypse-anticipating album that, perhaps paradoxically, was built to last for decades and even centuries to come." Writing for PopMatters, Eric Henderson called 1999 a "massive, sexy, rump-shaking, and sometimes even disturbing masterpiece" and stated that even though it may not be better than Dirty Mind, Purple Rain, and Sign o' the Times, the album represented a "quantum leap in sophistication and scope." Henderson also claimed that 1999 raised the bar for '80s funk.

1999 has appeared frequently on professional listings of the greatest albums. In 1989, Rolling Stone ranked 1999 16th on its list of the 100 Greatest Albums of the 1980s. In 2003, VH1 placed 1999 number 48 in its list of the 100 Greatest Albums. The album was also part of Slant Magazines list The 50 Most Essential Pop Albums and the magazine listed the album at number 8 on its list of Best Albums of the 1980s. In 2003, the album was ranked number 163 on Rolling Stone magazine's list of The 500 Greatest Albums of All Time.  It maintained the rating in a 2012 revised list, and was re-ranked number 130 in 2020.  The album was also included in the book 1001 Albums You Must Hear Before You Die. The album was inducted into the Grammy Hall of Fame in 2008. Based on such listings and honors, the aggregate website Acclaimed Music ranks it as the 207th most acclaimed album in history, as well as the third most from 1982.

Track listing

Original album

Alternate formats
Originally released on vinyl as a double LP (the first of a number of double sets from Prince), 1999 was cut to a single vinyl edition in some countries, omitting "D.M.S.R.", "Automatic", "All the Critics Love U in New York" and "International Lover"; this single LP was reissued as part of Record Store Day 2018.

Some countries in 1983, such as Brazil and Kenya, opted to issue the release as two separate vinyl albums, 1999 I and 1999 II.
The original compact disc version of the album was also cut, omitting "D.M.S.R." There is a notice on the back cover of the original compact disc pressing that reads "To enable the release of 1999 as a single compact disc, the song 'D.M.S.R.' has been omitted from the original LP edition." Later compact disc pressings (from a 1990 reissue onward) included the track. 
On the cassette release, "Free" was placed after "D.M.S.R." to end the first side, balancing out the lengths of both sides of the cassette.

Remastered, Deluxe and Super Deluxe editions
The Remastered edition contains a remaster of the original album. The Deluxe edition contains the remaster and a bonus disc with all the single, maxi-single and promo mixes as well as the B-sides. The Super Deluxe edition contains four more discs: Two of them contain 24 previously unissued studio tracks, the third contains a complete live audio performance of the 1999 Tour recorded at the late show (the second of two that day) in Detroit, Michigan, on November 30, 1982, and a DVD with another complete, previously unreleased concert from the 1999 Tour, recorded in multi-cam live at the Houston Summit on December 29, 1982. The albums were also issued on vinyl in a 2 LP, 4 LP and 10 LP + DVD set.

Personnel
Information taken from the Prince Vault website.

Musicians
 Prince – lead and backing vocals, all  instruments except as noted.
 Lisa Coleman – co-lead vocals (1), backing vocals (2, 3, 5, 6, 8)
 Dez Dickerson – co-lead vocals (1), guitar solos and backing vocals (2)
 Jill Jones – co-lead vocals (1), backing vocals (6, 8, 9)
 Jesse Johnson – background vocals (1) (uncredited)
 Brown Mark – background vocals and handclaps (5)
 Jamie Shoop – background vocals and handclaps (5)
 Carol McGovney – background vocals and handclaps (5)
 Peggy McCreary – background vocals and handclaps (5)
 Poochie – background vocals and handclaps (5)
 The Count – background vocals and handclaps (5)
 Vanity – backing vocals (8)
 Wendy Melvoin – backing vocals (8)

Production
 Prince - producer and arranger
 Peggy McCreary - engineer
 Don Batts - assistant engineer
 Bernie Grundman - mastering (A&M Records)

While not performance credited for the studio recordings, band members Doctor Fink (keyboards), Bobby Z. (drums) and Brown Mark (bass) do appear in the music videos.

Singles
 "1999" ( 12 US,  4 US R&B,  25 UK)
 "1999"
 "How Come U Don't Call Me Anymore?"
 "Little Red Corvette" ( 6 US,  15 US R&B,  54 UK)
 "Little Red Corvette"
 "All the Critics Love U in New York"
 "Delirious" ( 8 US,  18 US R&B)
 "Delirious"
 "Horny Toad"
 "Automatic" (AUS)
 "Automatic"
 "Something in the Water (Does Not Compute)"
 "Let's Pretend We're Married" ( 52 US,  55 US R&B)
 "Let's Pretend We're Married"
 "Irresistible Bitch"

Charts

Weekly charts

Original version

2019 reissue

Year-end charts

Certifications

References

Sources:

External links
 1999 at Discogs
 1999 at Prince Vault
 Podcast 

1982 albums
 Prince (musician) albums
 Albums produced by Prince (musician)
 Warner Records albums
 Grammy Hall of Fame Award recipients
 Albums recorded at Sunset Sound Recorders
 Albums recorded in a home studio
 Funk albums by American artists
 Art pop albums
 Dance music albums by American artists